MV Dunedin Star was a British refrigerated cargo liner. It was built by Cammell Laird and Co in 1935–36 as one of Blue Star Line's -class ships, designed to ship frozen meat from Australia and New Zealand to the UK. It served in the Second World War and is distinguished for its role in Operation Halberd to relieve the siege of Malta in September 1941.

Dunedin Star was lost at the end of November 1942 when it ran aground at Clan Alpine Shoal in the South Atlantic on the Skeleton Coast of Namibia, then South West Africa. A complex sea, air and land operation overcame many setbacks and rescued all of its passengers, crew and gunners. An aircraft, a tug and two of the tug's crew were lost in rescue attempts. It took a month for the last of Dunedin Stars crew to reach Cape Town, and more than two months for the last of the rescuers to return.

Building
Cammell Laird and Co in Birkenhead, England built Dunedin Star, launching it on 29 October 1935 and completing it in February 1936. It was owned by Union Cold Storage, a ship-owning company controlled by Blue Star Line.

The Imperial Star class were motor ships. Dunedin Star had a pair of 9-cylinder, two-stroke, single-acting Sulzer Bros marine diesel engines developing a total of 2,516 NHP and driving twin screws. Its navigation equipment included wireless direction finding, an echo sounding device and a gyrocompass.

Second World War service
After the United Kingdom entered the Second World War in September 1939 Dunedin Star initially continued its cargo liner service between Britain and Australia. As it was a fast merchant ship, it sailed unescorted until November 1940.

On 10 October 1939, the ship left Liverpool for Brisbane. It called at Las Palmas, Cape Town, Port Elizabeth, East London, Durban, Lourenço Marques, Sydney and Rockhampton, and reached Brisbane on 26 November. Three days later, the ship began its return voyage, and called at Newcastle, New South Wales, Sydney, Melbourne and Adelaide. It spent Christmas of 1939 sailing west across the Indian Ocean and New Year's Day of 1940 in Cape Town, then called at Las Palmas. On 18 January, it reached London.

On 31 January 1940, Dunedin Star left London for Brisbane again. It called at Las Palmas and Gladstone, Queensland, and reached Brisbane on 10 March. It began its return voyage six days later, and called at Albany, Western Australia; Fremantle; Cape Town and Las Palmas, reaching London on 3 May.

On 2 June 1940, Dunedin Star left London for Queensland again. It called at Lisbon, São Vicente, Cape Verde, Melbourne, Sydney, Brisbane and Cairns, and reached Townsville in northeastern Queensland on 18 July. On 22 June France had surrendered to Germany, which removed the powerful French Navy from the defense of Allied shipping, gave all of France's Atlantic ports and naval bases to the Kriegsmarine and its most strategic airfields to the Luftwaffe. Therefore, when Dunedin Star began its voyage home from Townsville on 21 July, it called at Rockhampton and Sydney but then turned east across the Pacific Ocean to Panama. It reached Balboa, Panama on 23 August, passed through the Panama Canal and called at Cristóbal, Colón two days later. It called at Curaçao in the Netherlands Antilles before crossing the North Atlantic, reaching Avonmouth on the Bristol Channel on 10 September.

Dunedin Star stayed in Avonmouth for a month, leaving on 10 October and reaching Liverpool two days later. On 1 November, it left Liverpool with Convoy WS 4, which divided into fast (WS 4F) and slow (WS 4S) sections. Dunedin Star went with WS 4F to Freetown, Sierra Leone and then continued via Durban to Suez, where it arrived on 22 December. It seems to have spent Christmas of 1940 and New Year's 1941 in Suez. On 12 January, it left for Colombo in Ceylon, where it arrived on 22 January. It made the Red Sea leg of its voyage from Suez to Aden with Convoy SW 4B, then detached and crossed the Indian Ocean unescorted.

Operation Halberd

By August 1941, Dunedin Star was back in Britain. On 9 August, it left the Firth of Clyde with Convoy WS 8C to Scapa Flow, returning to the Clyde on 17 August. Then it and a Blue Star sister ship, took part in Operation Halberd to relieve the siege of Malta. On 17 September they left the Clyde with Convoy WS 011D, which at sea became Convoy WS 11X. The convoy was bound for Bombay but the ships for Operation Halberd detached in the North Atlantic and reached Gibraltar on 24 September. There eight merchant ships formed Convoy GM 2, which left the same day under heavy Royal Navy escort for Malta.

On 27 September 1941, the Mediterranean Italian Regia Aeronautica aircraft attacked the convoy but were repulsed by naval escorts and air cover. That evening an Italian torpedo bomber hit Imperial Star. No crew were killed and the ship did not sink but was disabled so it was scuttled and abandoned. The remainder of the convoy safely reached the Grand Harbour at Valletta the next day. Dunedin Star stayed in Malta for four weeks, leaving unescorted on 22 October and calling at Gibraltar three days later.

Dunedin Stars movements for the next five months are not recorded. Then on 22 March 1942, it left the Clyde with Convoy WS 17 to Freetown. It continued via Cape Town to the Indian Ocean, reaching Bombay on 16 May and leaving Colombo on 13 July for Fremantle. There it joined Convoy ZK 12, which left on 27 July for Sydney. Dunedin Star detached en route and reached Melbourne on 3 August. Again, it returned from Australia to Britain via Panama, where it called on 17 September before crossing the North Atlantic and reaching Liverpool on 1 November.

Loss
On 9 November 1942, Dunedin Star left Liverpool for Egypt via Saldanha Bay, Cape Town and Aden. Its cargo was munitions and supplies for the British Eighth Army in the Middle East, and it was carrying 85 crew and 21 fare-paying passengers.

Dunedin Star left Liverpool with Convoy ON 145, which convoy was bound for New York. In the North Atlantic Dunedin Star detached and headed for South Africa. However, at 2230 hrs on 29 November off the Skeleton Coast of South West Africa it struck an underwater obstacle, presumed by the subsequent South African Court of Inquiry to be the poorly charted Clan Alpine Shoal. Its wireless operator sent a distress signal, which was received ashore at Walvis Bay.

Dunedin Star began rapidly taking on water and its pumps were unable to cope. Its master, Captain RB Lee, chose to beach the ship for the safety of its passengers, crew, and valuable cargo.

Captain Lee feared the heavy sea could break up the ship. Therefore, he had the crew lower its motor boat and start putting people ashore. The boat completed two trips, putting ashore a total of 63 people including eight women, three babies and a number of elderly men. Then the rough sea disabled the boat and it was stranded on the beach. They were left with no shelter and only the boat's water and food rations to sustain them. Another 42 people, including Captain Lee, were left aboard the beached ship.

The  minesweeper , a converted civilian vessel, left Walvis Bay at 1400 hrs on 30 November laden with emergency supplies packed into Carley floats to take ashore to the survivors on the beach. The Norwegian  cargo ship  and Manchester Liners'  cargo steamship  also diverted to help. Meanwhile, at Windhoek a land rescue convoy, led by Captain JWB Smith of the South African Police, set out to reach those survivors who were ashore.

The ships reached Dunedin Star on 1 or 2 December. Nerine launched some of its supply-laden Carley floats to reach the shore party, but the strong current swept them away. It moved closer to the shore, launched its remaining floats and returned to Walvis Bay. Temeraire launched its motor boat and took 10 men off Dunedin Star, but the boat shipped a lot of water which stopped its motor. The Norwegian boatmen then rowed for an hour-and-a-half to Manchester Division, which took the 10 survivors aboard. The Norwegians were now so exhausted that Temeraire had to take them and their boat back aboard. The next day Sir Charles Elliot arrived. Temeraire again lowered its motorboat, which in four trips rescued the remaining 32 men from Dunedin Star and transferred them all to Sir Charles Elliot. In the heavy sea the tug then struggled to get alongside Manchester Division to transfer all of the rescued men except Captain Lee and his chief and second engineers, who were taken aboard Nerine.

On 3 December, Sir Charles Elliot left to return to Walvis Bay, but about 0600 hrs the next morning it grounded just north of Rocky Point. Most of its crew managed to swim ashore through the strong current, but First Officer Angus McIntyre and deckhand Mathias Korabseb did not survive.

At 1400 hrs on 3 December, a South African Air Force Lockheed Ventura coastal patrol aircraft was sent from Cape Town to drop supplies on the beach for the survivors. At about 1620 hrs the pilot, Captain Immins Naude, found the beach. His crew dropped the supplies but most were destroyed on impact. Naude landed on a nearby flat piece of land with the intention of rescuing some of the remaining survivors on the beach. Unfortunately, the land was a salt pan disguised by desert sand. The next day it was discovered that the Ventura's undercarriage had sunk through the crusted surface of the salt, damaging the aircraft and leaving it stuck in the sand.

Three other SAAF Venturas flew supply missions to drop water, food and other emergency supplies. They often flew several flights a day to the survivors on the beach. At times they also dropped supplies to Captain Smith's land convoy on the way from Windhoek to the beach. On 8 December Captain Smith's land convoy reached Rocky Point and Sir Charles Elliots survivors and took them to a makeshift landing strip. There Lt Col PS Joubert landed a Ventura and picked up the tug's surviving crew.

In Walvis Bay, Nerine refuelled and loaded new supplies, and on 7 December headed north again. It reached Dunedin Star two days later and launched its lifeboat, which unsuccessfully tried to fire a line ashore by rocket. Instead Nerines radio operator, Denis Scully, swam ashore with a rope tied about his waist. That day 14 crew, two women and two children were taken off the beach and transferred to Nerine. On 10 December eight more of the survivors from the beach were transferred to the minesweeper.

Captain Smith's convoy then reached the beach and rescued those survivors who had not been transferred by lifeboat to Nerine. Smith's 11 trucks got back to Windhoek on 23 December, where the survivors stayed before continuing overland by train. They reached Cape Town on 28 December.

On 17 January 1943, Captain Naude left Windhoek leading an overland convoy to recover the Ventura. After on-site repairs and a four-day digging effort, he finally got the plane airborne on 29 January. However, after only 43 minutes' flying time the aircraft developed engine trouble and ditched in the sea about 200 yards offshore near Rocky Point. Naude and his two fellow aircrew members survived the crash and managed to swim ashore. Their returning land convoy rescued them on 1 February.

All of Dunedin Stars passengers, crew and DEMS gunners survived, thanks to the courage and resource of many rescuers by sea, air, and land. But it was at a high cost: one Ventura aircraft, the tug Sir Charles Elliot and two of the tug's crew were killed.

The Court of Enquiry found Captain Lee culpable for the loss of his ship. Blue Star Line dismissed him and he turned to be a publican in England. In 1943 or 1944, Blue Star re-engaged him as the master of one of the merchant ships for one of the Allied landings in Europe. After this contract, Blue Star did not offer him another ship. He later emigrated to India, where he died shortly after his arrival.

Dunedin Stars chief electrician went on to serve on the landing ship , and was killed when it sank in the English Channel on 28 December 1944.

Some of Dunedin Stars cargo was salvaged in 1951. Some remains are visible to this day on the beach, among them a section of decking from the bow or of the stern.

Successor ship

After the War, Blue Star Line bought a cargo ship that was being built by Alexander Stephen and Sons at Linthouse on the River Clyde. It had been laid down for Lancashire Shipping Ltd as Bolton Castle for trade with China. However, in 1949, the Chinese Communist Revolution reduced this trade so Lancashire Shipping sold it on the stocks to Blue Star.

The new ship was launched on 18 April 1950 as a second  and completed that September. Unusually for a Blue Star ship, it had only some of its holds refrigerated. Nevertheless, it spent 25 years in service with the Blue Star group.

In 1968, the ship was transferred to the Blue Star subsidiary Lamport and Holt, which renamed it Roland 2. It spent most of the next seven years on a regular route between Río de la Plata, Brazil and the UK. In 1975, it was sold to Pallas Maritime of Cyprus, who renamed it Jessica. After two more changes of the owner, it was scrapped in 1978 at Gadani ship-breaking yard in Pakistan.

See also
Eduard Bohlen – a German cargo and passenger ship that was wrecked on the Skeleton Coast in 1909

References

Sources and further reading

External links
 television documentary including interviews with survivors and SAAF pilot Captain Immins Naude

1935 ships
1942 in South West Africa
Cargo liners
Maritime incidents in November 1942
Merchant ships of the United Kingdom
Ships built on the River Mersey
Ships of the Blue Star Line
Shipwrecks of Namibia
World War II merchant ships of the United Kingdom
World War II shipwrecks in the Atlantic Ocean
Ships of the Lamport and Holt Line